The 2022 Virginia Tech Hokies women's soccer team represented Virginia Tech during the 2022 NCAA Division I women's soccer season. It was the 30th season of the university fielding a program and 19th competing in the Atlantic Coast Conference. The Hokies were led by 12th year head coach Charles Adair and played their home games at Thompson Field.

The team finished 10–6–2 overall and 4–5–1 in ACC play to finish in eighth place.  They did not qualify for the ACC Tournament as only six teams were invited. They received an at-large bid to the NCAA Tournament.  As an unseeded team in the UCLA Bracket they travelled to seventh-seed  in the First Round.  They lost the game 2–0 to end their season.

Previous season 

The Hokies finished the season 12–6–2, 5–3–2 in ACC play to finish in eight place.  They did not qualify for the ACC Tournament as only six teams were invited. They received an at-large bid to the NCAA Tournament where they defeated Ohio State in the First Round before losing to Arkansas in the Second Round to end their season.

Offseason

Departures

Recruiting Class

Squad

Roster

Team management

Source:

Schedule 

Source:

|-
!colspan=6 style=""| Exhibition

|-
!colspan=6 style=""| Non-Conference Regular season

|-
!colspan=6 style=""| ACC Regular Season

|-
!colspan=6 style=""| NCAA Tournament

Awards and honors

Rankings

References 

Virginia Tech
Virginia Tech
2021
Virginia Tech women's soccer
Virginia Tech